Bacopa crenata, the waterhyssop, brahmi, or moneywort, is a perennial or annual medicinal herb indigenous to tropical Africa and Madagascar.

Description
Its leaves are also lanceolate to ovate and are arranged oppositely (opposite deccusate) on the stem. Its flowers are small, actinomorphic, and range from white to blue or purple, with four to five petals. Its ability to grow in water makes it a popular aquarium plant.

Habitat and ecology
Bacopa crenata grows in marshy areas throughout West Africa, Angola, Madagascar, Kenya, and Tanzania.

Uses
The leaves of Bacopa crenata are used in Africa to treat conjunctivitus and headaches, and to heal wounds.

References

Plantaginaceae
Medicinal plants of Africa
Aquarium plants